Jagdish Pradhan is an Indian politician and a member of the Sixth Legislative Assembly of Delhi in India. He represents the Mustafabad constituency of New Delhi and is a member of the Bharatiya Janata Party political party.

Early life and education
Jagdish Pradhan was born in New Delhi. He attended the Loni Inter College and is educated till tenth grade degree.

Political career
Jagdish Pradhan has been a MLA for one term. He represented the Mustafabad constituency and is a member of the Bharatiya Janata Party political party.

Posts held

See also

Bhartiya Janata Party
Delhi Legislative Assembly
Government of India
Mustafabad (Delhi Assembly constituency)
Politics of India
Sixth Legislative Assembly of Delhi

References 

1953 births
Bharatiya Janata Party politicians from Delhi
Delhi MLAs 2015–2020
Living people
People from North East Delhi district